Frederick Stevens or Stephens may refer to:

Fred Stevens, British former Grand Prix motorcycle road racer
Frederick Stevens (American politician) (1861–1923), U.S. Representative from Minnesota
Frederick C. Stevens (New York politician) (1856–1916), New York politician
Frederic George Stephens (1827–1907), British art critic and member of the Pre-Raphaelite Brotherhood
Frederick J. Stephens (born 1945), English author of militaria books
Frederic W. Stevens (1839-1928), U.S. lawyer and banker 
Frederick William Stevens (1847–1900), English architectural engineer
Frederick P. Stevens (1810–1866), mayor of Buffalo, New York, 1856–1857
Frederick Stephens (British Army officer) (1906–1967)
Frederick Stephens (cricketer) (1836–1909), English cricketer and British Army officer 
Frederick Stevens (Australian politician) (1820–1888), merchant and politician in colonial Victoria